Nathan Rich (born February 13, 1982) is an American author, Scientology critic and content creator. He appeared on Leah Remini: Scientology and the Aftermath alongside classmate Tara Reile about their experiences at the Scientology boarding school, the Mace-Kingsley Ranch School.

Early life and education 
Rich is the only child of Julie Miriam Rich, a pet communicator, who died from cancer in 2010. He completed only two school grades, seventh and eighth grades, at Dunedin Academy. He spent four years at the Mace Kingsley Ranch when he was 8 and 14 years old. At 17, he left home and was later disconnected by his family. He spent seven years homeless while using and dealing drugs before attending community college.

Scientology

Mace-Kingsley Ranch 
At 8 years old, Rich was sent to the Scientology boarding school, the Mace-Kingsley Ranch in Palmdale, California, and then again at age 14. Rich alleges the Ranch was an abusive environment, with punishments including being scrubbed with a metal fence brush and paddling from the staff.

Documentaries 
In October 2017 Rich appeared in episode 17 of the U.S. documentary series, Leah Remini: Scientology and the Aftermath.

Personal life 
Since moving to China, Rich has started a video blog sympathetic to the People's Republic of China. Among the views he holds are that those who had taken part in the Hong Kong protests were "terrorists" and "right-wing", and that Taiwan was an integral part of China and could therefore not be a state. He has also commented on the China–United States trade war and China's handling of the coronavirus pandemic.

See also 
Tony Ortega
Propaganda in China

References

External links 
 
 

1982 births
American people of Polish-Jewish descent
American former Scientologists
Critics of Scientology
American expatriates in China
21st-century American male writers
Writers from Los Angeles
21st-century American memoirists
Chief technology officers
Living people